Cochrane Station is an inter-city railway and bus station located in the town of Cochrane, Ontario Canada operated by the Ontario Northland Railway (ONR). It is the southern terminus of the Polar Bear Express service to Moosonee (on the Moose River south of James Bay) and former northern terminus of the discontinued Northlander route. The station is located in downtown Cochrane, south of the intersection of Railway Street and 7th Avenue. Its main entrance faces north to Railway Street. South of the station building, trains call at a low level platform adjacent to the ONR Island Falls Subdivision.

Railway services
As of April 2021, the Polar Bear Express operates four days per week, with a morning departure and evening arrival on Monday, Tuesday, Thursday, and Friday.

On September 28 2012, the Ontario Northland Railway operated the last Northlander train between Cochrane and Toronto, and replaced the route with a bus service. 

The Ontario government has stated, however, that it intends to preserve the Polar Bear Express train service between Cochrane and Moosonee as an "essential service".

Inter-city bus
Inter-city buses from Ontario Northland Motor Coach Services connect Cochrane station to a number of destinations in Northern Ontario such as Hearst, Timmins, Gogama (served by Via Rail's Canadian at Gogama station), North Bay and Sudbury.

On the second floor of the station is the Station Inn Hotel (operated by Ontario Northland). The Cochrane Yard, a small train yard used to store trains for ONR is also located nearby.

References

External links
Ontario Northland Cochrane
Travelling on the Train: Polar Bear Express (Ontario Northland)
Ontario Northland Bus Schedules 500 and 600 Sudbury - Timmins - Hearst
Ontario Northland Bus Schedules 700 and 800 North Bay - Matheson - Timmins - Cochrane - Hearst
Station Inn Hotel - Hotel adjacent to Cochrane station

Ontario Northland Railway stations
Transport in Cochrane, Ontario
Railway stations in Cochrane District